Jagat Singh Jakhar (born 6 October 1956) was a Haryanvi film actor. He appeared in a dozen Haryanvi films until his death in 2011. He was the main lead of the largest grossing Haryanvi film, Chandrawal (1984).

Early life
He was born in a village of Sundreti in the Jhajjar district of the state Haryana in 1956. His father Surat Singh Jakhar was a farmer. He spent the early years of his life in his village then went to Rohtak to complete his graduation before going to Haryana Agricultural University for higher studies to graduate as a veterinary surgeon.

Career
Jakhar appeared in around a dozen films during his career. He had most success in the film Chandrawal where he played a doomed lover. The film went on to break many box office records. Shortly before his death he was filming a television serial called Sapne.

Death
Jagat Jakhar died in the PGI hospital of Chandigarh at the age of 55 on 17 December 2011 due to a liver infection. He was reportedly in hospital for treatment related to his liver for a few days. On 17 December 2011, his funeral services were held.

Selected filmography
Muklawa
Shanichar
Chadro
 Chandrawal
 Chandra Kiran
Sapne (TV serial)
Anpadh Jat (unreleased)

References 

Indian male film actors
Haryanvi cinema
1956 births
2011 deaths